Kaiserwald may refer to:

 Kaiserwald concentration camp, a WWII German concentration camp near Mežaparks, Latvia
 Kaiserwald Riga, a Baltic German football club
 The German name for Mežaparks, a neighbourhood in Riga, Latvia
 The German name for Mežaparks (park), an urban park in the Mežaparks neighbourhood
 The German name for Slavkovský les, a mountain range in the Czech Republic